is located on the western part of Shakotan, Hokkaido, Japan. Its lighthouse, the Cape Kamui Lighthouse, overlooks the Sea of Japan. An earthquake off the cape on 2 August 1940 resulted in a tsunami that killed ten people.

Gallery

See also
 Niseko-Shakotan-Otaru Kaigan Quasi-National Park

References

External links

Kamui
Landforms of Hokkaido